The 1956 Rhode Island gubernatorial election was held on November 6, 1956. Incumbent Democrat Dennis J. Roberts defeated Republican nominee Christopher Del Sesto with 50.09% of the vote.

General election

Candidates
Dennis J. Roberts, Democratic 
Christopher Del Sesto, Republican

Results

References

1956
Rhode Island
Gubernatorial